Viscount Davidson, of Little Gaddesden in the County of Hertford, is a title in the Peerage of the United Kingdom. It was created on 11 June 1937 for the Conservative politician and former Member of Parliament for Hemel Hempstead, Sir J. C. C. Davidson.

His elder son Andrew, the second Viscount, served as Captain of the Yeomen of the Guard from 1986 to 1991 in the Conservative administrations of Margaret Thatcher and John Major. However, he lost his seat in the House of Lords after the passing of the House of Lords Act 1999. Andrew died in 2012 and the title was inherited by his brother Malcolm. Malcolm died in 2019 and the title was inherited by Malcolm's son John.

Viscounts Davidson (1937)
John Colin Campbell Davidson, 1st Viscount Davidson (1889–1970)
(John) Andrew Davidson, 2nd Viscount Davidson (1928–2012)
Malcolm William Mackenzie Davidson, 3rd Viscount Davidson (1934–2019)
John Nicolas Alexander Davidson, 4th Viscount Davidson (b. 1971)

There is no heir.

References

Kidd, Charles, Williamson, David (editors). Debrett's Peerage and Baronetage (1990 edition). New York: St Martin's Press, 1990.

Viscountcies in the Peerage of the United Kingdom
Noble titles created in 1937
Noble titles created for UK MPs